Carfenazine (INN) (former developmental code name WY-2445), or carphenazine (BAN), also known as carphenazine maleate (USAN) (brand name Proketazine; former developmental code name NSC-71755), is an antipsychotic and tranquilizer of the phenothiazine group that was withdrawn from the market.

Synthesis

The alkylation reaction between 2-Propionyl Phenothiazine [92-33-1] (1) and 1-Bromo-3-chloropropane (2) gives 1-[10-(3-chloropropyl)phenothiazin-2-yl]propan-1-one [95157-45-2] (3). A second alkylation step, this time with 2-(1-Piperazinyl)ethanol [103-76-4] (4) completes the synthesis of Carfenazine (5).

NB: Although above procedure is proof-of-concept, bear in mind no protecting group {Other patent uses ketalization technique}

Analogues
Butaperazine uses butanoyl (Butyryl) and not propanoyl group.
Fluphenazine selfsame but trifluoromethyl on position 2 of the phenothiazine ring.

References

Phenothiazines
Typical antipsychotics
Withdrawn drugs